Kyle Douglas Hawkins (born May 6, 1980) is an American attorney and professor who served as Solicitor General of Texas from September 2018 until February 2021. Hawkins currently serves as adjunct professor at the University of Texas at Austin's law school.

Early life and education

Hawkins graduated from Edina High School in Edina, Minnesota in 1998, and then attended Harvard University, where he received a bachelor's degree magna cum laude in 2002. He then worked as a management consultant in Chicago for two years, before moving to Japan for another two years to teach English. In 2006, Hawkins returned to Minnesota to attend the University of Minnesota Law School where he served as Editor in Chief of the Minnesota Law Review and graduated summa cum laude in 2009 with a Juris Doctor degree.

Legal career
After law school, Hawkins worked briefly at Faegre Baker Daniels before serving as a law clerk for Judge Edith Jones on the United States Court of Appeals for the Fifth Circuit in 2010. Following this clerkship, he worked for Gibson, Dunn & Crutcher in Washington, D.C. before serving as a law clerk for Justice  Samuel Alito of the United States Supreme Court during the 2013–14 term. He then rejoined Gibson, Dunn & Crutcher, where he practiced law through their Dallas, Texas office before joining the Texas Attorney General's office in 2017, as an assistant solicitor general. In September 2018, he was appointed Solicitor General of Texas by Texas Attorney General Ken Paxton to succeed Scott A. Keller.

In his role as the state's solicitor general, Hawkins represented Texas in cases before state and federal appellate courts, including the U.S. Supreme Court. In 2018, Hawkins argued on behalf of 36 states seeking to uphold the separate sovereignty exception in Gamble v. United States. A 2020 speech he gave at Stanford University Law School regarding the legality of the federal Deferred Action for Childhood Arrivals policy was the subject of a student walk-out.

Hawkins resigned from office effective February 1, 2021, and was succeeded by Judd E. Stone II. He then rejoined Gibson, Dunn & Crutcher as a partner in its Houston, Texas office.

See also
List of law clerks of the Supreme Court of the United States (Seat 8)

References

1980 births
Living people
University of Minnesota Law School alumni
Texas lawyers
Law clerks of the Supreme Court of the United States
Solicitors General of Texas
Harvard College alumni
People associated with Gibson Dunn
Edina High School alumni